This is a list of fortifications of Malta.

Prehistoric fortifications

Walled cities

Forts

Towers

Notes:
For privately built towers, see List of fortifications of Malta#Fortified houses and privately built towers.

Batteries

Notes:
Batteries located within larger fortifications are not included in the above list unless they are notable in their own right. Such batteries include:
De Guiral Battery in Fort Saint Angelo
Grunenburgh's Batteries in Fort Saint Angelo, Valletta and Senglea
Low Battery in the Cittadella
Several other batteries within the fortifications of Birgu
Anti-aircraft batteries built in World War II are also not included.

Redoubts

Entrenchments

Notes:
Entrenchments were originally planned to be built around the entire coastline of the Maltese Islands. The ones listed here are those of which some remains survive, or which are definitely known to have existed.

Lines of fortification

Notes:
The Floriana Lines, Santa Margherita Lines and the Cottonera Lines are also lines of fortification, but they are listed with the walled cities since they are close to settlements.

Stop walls
The 'stop wall' that plugged a fortification gap in Wied Żnuber

Fortified houses and privately built towers

Ta' Cirpisin Tower
Castellan Country House

Notes

References

External links

 List
Fortifications
Malta